The TW73 is a teargas grenade gun. It is now called the Mehrzweckwerfer (General Purpose Thrower) MZW 73/91 because there is now other ammunition than teargas grenades like rubber shot bullets available. It was developed in Switzerland, built on the wooden stock of an old military carbine. It was developed originally for use against anti-nuclear-power demonstrators who were occupying areas. All Swiss police corps and the Swiss Army use it.

It is 80 cm (31.5 in) long, weighs 5 kg (11 lb), can fire 6–10 shots per minute. Range is 180 m (600 ft) (160 m or  520 ft with the older shells). The range can be shortened by turning a ring which lets part of the propulsion gases escape.

External links
 (in German) (written in an anti-police style)

Firearms of Switzerland
Teargas grenade guns